Helmer & Son is a 2006 short film directed by Søren Pilmark. The film was nominated for the 2007 Academy Award for Best Live Action Short Film.

References 

2006 films
2006 short films
2000s Danish-language films
Danish short films